Export and Industry Bank (EIB) (formerly ), also known as Exportbank, was a commercial bank in the Philippines.  It acquired Urban Bank in 2001 after the former collapsed due to its closure by the Bangko Sentral ng Pilipinas. It formed in 1996 by the Lippo Group based in Hong Kong. It was placed under receivership by the Philippine Deposit Insurance Corporation (PDIC) on April 27, 2012, after it was closed by the Bangko Sentral ng Pilipinas on the basis of being insolvent. This was after fall-out of a rehabilitation deal between it and Banco de Oro Universal Bank (BDO) but did not push through due to the pending legal matters concerning the bank that stopped short of the deal. Exportbank had liabilities worth around PHP700 to 800 million.

In March 2014, Union Bank of the Philippines has offered to buy Exportbank. Unionbank's prospective entry as a strategic investor in EIB is backed by the bank's uninsured depositors. EIB has about P10.7 billion in uninsured deposits, a majority of whom—holding a combined deposit of P8.2 billion—had given special powers of attorney to a group called “Coalition of EIB Uninsured Depositors” seeking the rehabilitation of the bank as an alternative to liquidation. Union Bank proposes a scheme whereby P150,000 of every P1 million worth of deposits will be converted into equity in the parent company, the publicly listed Union Bank, Inc., while the remaining 85 percent will be converted to negotiable notes entitled to interest of one percent per annum. These notes can be traded and/or used as collateral.

Subsidiaries and affiliates
Exportbank was divided into the following subsidiaries and affiliates:
EIB Realty Developers
EIB Savings Bank
EIB Securities
ValuGen Financial Insurance Company

Former subsidiaries and affiliates
Urban Building Technologies
Urbancorp Insurance Brokers
Urbancorp Realty Holdings
Urbancorp Technologies Corporation
ValueFinance

Ownership
Lippo Group: 37%
AO Capital: 22%
AMY Holdings: 20%
RZB Group: 9.5%
Public stock: 11.5%

References

External links
Export and Industry Bank

Banks of the Philippines
Banks established in 1996
Companies based in Makati
Banks disestablished in 2012
1996 establishments in the Philippines
2012 disestablishments in the Philippines
Bank failures
Companies listed on the Philippine Stock Exchange
Philippine companies established in 1996